Jerry Bell may refer to:

Jerry Bell (American football) (born 1959), American football player 
Jerry Bell (pitcher) (born 1947), American baseball player
Jerry Bell (baseball executive) (born 1937), American baseball executive

See also
Jeremy Bell (disambiguation)
Gerry Bell (disambiguation)
Jerome Bell, musician
Gerard Bell, actor, see Bryony Lavery
Gerald Bell (born 1890), Canadian World War I flying ace